Anthony is an English surname. It derived from the Antonius root name. Notable people with the surname include:

 Allen C. Anthony (1906/1907 - May 10, 1962) American actor and announcer
 Anthony Anthony, creator of the 16th century naval record called the Anthony Roll
 Andre Anthony (born 1996), American football player
 Barbara Cox Anthony (1922–2007), American businesswoman
 Byron Anthony (born 1984), Welsh footballer
 Carmelo Anthony (born 1984), American basketball player
 Casey Anthony (born 1986), Florida woman accused of murdering her young child (trial: 2011)
 Charles Anthony (disambiguation) 
 Cole Anthony (born 2000), American basketball player
 Daniel Anthony (disambiguation) 
 David Anthony (disambiguation) 
 Doug Anthony (1929–2020), Australian politician
 Earl Anthony (1938–2001), American professional bowler
 Earle C. Anthony (1880–1961), American businessman
 Evelyn Anthony (1926–2018), British writer
 Florence Anthony, (1947–2010), American poet and educator
 Frank Anthony (1908–1993), Indian politician
 George T. Anthony (1824–1896), American politician 
 Gerald Anthony (1951–2004), American actor
 Greg Anthony (born 1967), American basketball player and analyst
 James C. Anthony, American professor and psychiatric epidemiologist
 Jasmine Jessica Anthony (born 1996), American actress
 Joel Anthony (born 1982), Canadian basketball player
 John Gould Anthony (1804–1877), American naturalist and malacologist
 Julie Anthony (disambiguation)
 Kendall Anthony (born 1993), American basketball player in the Israeli National League
 Kenny Anthony (born 1951), Saint Lucian politician
 Lysette Anthony (born 1963), English actress
 Mark Anthony (disambiguation) 
 Matt Anthony (Canadian football) (1921–2000), Canadian football player
 Michael Anthony (disambiguation)
 Patricia Anthony (1947–2013), American author
 Piers Anthony (born 1934), English-American writer
 Ray Anthony (born 1922), American bandleader, trumpeter, songwriter and actor
 Rufin Anthony (1940–2016), Pakistani Catholic bishop
 Ryan Anthony (1969–2020), American trumpet player
 Sean Anthony (disambiguation)
 Simon Anthony, English puzzler, co-founder of the YouTube channel Cracking the Cryptic
 Susan B. Anthony (1820–1906), American activist
 Tony Anthony (disambiguation)
 Wilfred E. Anthony, American architect

See also

Anthoney
Anthoni, name

References

English-language surnames